The  is a socialist political party in Japan founded on 3 March 1996 by a group of politicians who left the Social Democratic Party.

The party's ideology is similar to that of the Japanese Communist Party, advocating socialism (including scientific socialism and Marxism), direct democracy, non-interventionism and pacifism. The party hopes to start a "peaceful democratic revolution", and wants to enshrine pacifism and human rights in the Constitution of Japan. The party also opposes nuclear power, saying it could be used for nuclear weaponry in the future.

See also 
 Leftist Socialist Party of Japan

References

External links 
  New Socialist Party of Japan

Direct democracy parties
Left-wing parties in Japan
Pacifism in Japan
Pacifist parties
Political parties established in 1996
Socialist parties in Japan